Club Smith are an English electro indie band based in York and Leeds, England. The band currently consists of Sam Robson (vocals/guitar), Neil Clark (keyboard/backing vocals), Lee Clark (bass guitar/backing vocals). The band are known for their energetic live performances and have toured venues and festivals across the UK and Europe. The band were one of the acts featured on the BBC’s ‘introducing’ stage at the Reading and Leeds Festivals in 2010.

History
As Club Smith’s presence has grown they have continued to support leading acts such as the Sunshine Underground, Mystery Jets, The Pigeon Detectives and Two Door Cinema Club and have played venues all over the UK and as far away as Berlin in addition to playing the 2010 Reading and Leeds Festivals. In 2010 they released their first two EPs, The Loss and The Process. In 2011 the band are released their debut single "No Friend of Mine" and "Young Defeatists" as a double A side through Front Wall Records. The official release date is 6 June 2011.

This was followed by a second single released in November 2011, "Call to Harm" through All Sorted Records. Both singles were picked up in national press such as the Independent and Music Week, with Radio DJs Steve Lamacq (6music), John Kennedy (XFM) and Tom Robinson (6music) playing the singles  and XFM placing "Call to Harm" on the Evening playlist during November 2011.

In late 2011, Club Smith went into the studio with record producers Will Jackson and James Kenosha to record their debut album.

During early 2012, Club Smith were selected by Kaiser Chiefs as tour support for seven shows where the band enjoyed a warm reception selling over 900 tour CDs from the merchandise stand. This led to a distribution deal with Tri-tone and PIASUK distribution which was signed as a partnership with All Sorted !?! Records. The band and label formed and imprint "ASR" to release the debut Club Smith album.  During the tour with Kaiser Chiefs Club Smith picked up positive reviews from press such as The Fly, Record of the Day, Artrocker and music blog Music Broke My Bones.

On 17 August 2012, Club Smith announced they would release their debut album Appetite for Chivalry through ASR / Tri-tone (Distributed UK-wide by PIAS Entertainment Group) on 12 November 2012.  A limited edition format of the album was released from the band website on the same day.

In January 2013, it was announced that Vijay Mistry would join Kaiser Chiefs as their new drummer.  The band confirmed this on their website, with further detail of how the move would affect the future of the band in an interview with Counterfeit Magazine.

In July 2013, Club Smith announced they had signed to Sentric Music in a co-publishing deal with Strictly Confidential, the Brussels-based publishing arm of PIAS Group.

Major performances
 Bfest in 2009
 Supported The Sunshine Underground on Leeds leg of their UK tour in 2010
 Supported Mystery Jets on York leg of their UK tour in 2010
 Leeds and Reading Festivals in 2010
 Supported Two Door Cinema Club on York leg of their UK tour in 2010
 Supported The Pigeon Detectives on nine dates of their 2011 UK Tour
 Supported Kaiser Chiefs on seven dates of their 2012 UK Tour
 Supported Shed Seven for the Manchester leg of their 2011 tour and two festival warm up gigs in London and Sheffield in 2012.

Discography

EPs
 The Loss EP (March 2010)
 The Process EP (June 2010)

On compilations
Dance to the Radio 5th Anniversary special ("Lament", track 3) (Dance to the Radio) (April 2010)

Singles
 "No Friend of Mine" / "Young Defeatists" (Double A side - June 2011) (Front Wall Records)
 "Call to Harm" (November 2011) (All Sorted !?! Records)
 "Lament" (November 2012) (ASR / Tri-Tone / PIASUK)
 "Beautiful & Useless" (Dave Bascombe / Lance Thomas Mix) (April 2013) (Tri-Tone)
 "The Green Room" (Dave Bascombe / Lance Thomas Mix) (September 2013) (Tri-Tone)

Album
 Appetite for Chivalry (12 November 2012, UK) (ASR / Tri-Tone / PIAS)

References

Musical quartets
Indie rock groups from Leeds
English electronic music groups